The following is a list of Catholic bishops, priests and religious who were awarded and nominated for the Nobel Prize.

Laureates

Nominees

Notes

References

Lists of Nobel laureates by religion
Catholic clergy scientists
Lists of Roman Catholics
Lists of Christian scientists